Langenes is a village in Kristiansand municipality in Agder county, Norway. The village is located along the Norwegian County Road 456, just east of the village of Åros. The village sits on the coastline in the southeastern part of the greater Søgne area. In 2020 it became part of the municipality of Kristiansand, prior to that time it was in Søgne municipality. The Langenes Church is located in the village.

As a part of the greater Søgne urban area, separate population statistics are not tracked for Langenes.

References

Villages in Agder
Geography of Kristiansand